Masculine Ghislain, Guislain, Gislain or Ghiselin and feminine Ghislaine or Ghyslaine is a French personal name used in countries with French-speaking populations. It is originated with a 7th century saint, Saint Ghislain (died 680) of Hainaut and was latinized as Gislenus.

Etymologically, the name is usually said to derive from the oblique case of a Proto-West Germanic root: *gīsl “hostage, pledge” (see Wiktionary:Ghislain). As such, it is cognate with modern German Geisel "hostage". (However, one source has instead claimed that the name is derived from Germanic roots gis "information" and lind "sweet".) The name possibly became popular as a secondary given name, which was intended to give infants the protection of St Ghislain.

Other people with this given name include:
 Ghislaine Dommanget (1900–1991), Princess of Monaco and actress
 Ghislaine Alexander (1922–2000), British heiress and socialite
 Ghislain Cloquet (1924–1981), Belgian-born French cinematographer
 Ghislaine Roquet (1926–2016), Canadian philosophy professor and nun
 Ghislain Fournier (born 1938), Canadian politician and businessman
 Ghislaine Thesmar (born 1943), French ballet dancer
 Ghislain de Montgolfier (born 1943), French winemaker, head of the Bollinger Champagne house
 Ghislaine Barnay (born 1945), French athlete
 Ghislain Harvey (born 1946), Canadian politician
 Ghislain Lebel (born 1946), Canadian politician
 Ghyslaine Côté (born 1955), Canadian filmmaker
 Ghislaine Maxwell (born 1961), British socialite, daughter of Robert Maxwell, companion of Jeffrey Epstein and convicted sex criminal
 Lady Ghislaine, yacht named after Maxwell
 Ghislain Anselmini (born 1970), French footballer* Ghislain Lemaire (born 1972), French judoka
 Ghislain Poirier, artist name Poirier (born 1976), Canadian DJ from Montreal
 Ghislain Gimbert (born 1985), French footballer
 Gislaine Cristina Souza da Silva (born 1988), Brazilian footballer
 Ghyslain Raza (born circa 1988), creator of the viral video Star Wars Kid
 Ghislain Barbe, Canadian illustrator
 Gislain Ejabo, Cameroonian-born in Konda Village/ Bamenda petroleum engineer

See also
 7112 Ghislaine (1986 GV), a main-belt asteroid

References

French masculine given names